Orin O'Brien (born 1935) is an American double bassist. She has been a member of the New York Philharmonic since joining in 1966 under the direction of Leonard Bernstein; she was the first woman to join the orchestra. She was on the faculty  at the Juilliard School (where she was co-chair of the double bass department from 1992 to 2002), and currently teaches at Manhattan School of Music, and Mannes College The New School for Music. O'Brien is also currently on the Preparatory Division faculty at the Manhattan School.

Career
O'Brien was born in Hollywood, California to actors George O'Brien and Marguerite Churchill. She began her studies with Milton Kestenbaum, former principal bass of the Pittsburgh Symphony under Fritz Reiner and member of the NBC Symphony under Arturo Toscanini; and with Herman Reinshagen, assistant-principal bass of the New York Philharmonic under Gustav Mahler and Arturo Toscanini at the University of California, Los Angeles. She continued her studies at the Juilliard School in New York City with Frederick Zimmermann, assistant principal double bass of the New York Philharmonic for many of his 36 years there.  O'Brien attended the Music Academy of the West summer conservatory in 1952,1953,1954 and 1955.

Before joining the New York Philharmonic, O'Brien performed with the New York City Ballet, the Metropolitan Opera, and the American Symphony Orchestra (under Leopold Stokowski, under whom she played the double bass solo as principal bass in the U.S. premiere of Alberto Ginastera's Variaciones Concertantes, in 1962). She performed at the Marlboro Music Festival in the 1960s where she made recordings with Pablo Casals and gave the premiere of Gunther Schuller's Quartet for Double Basses, which was later recorded with Alvin Brehm, Robert Gladstone and Frederick Zimmermann.

She formerly taught at YMHA, the Estherwood Summer Musical Festival, and the Institute de Haute Etudes Musicales in Montreux, Switzerland. Orin O'Brien has given masterclasses at the Peabody Institute, the Tanglewood Festival, New England Conservatory, and Yale University.

Family
O'Brien is the sister of true crime author Darcy O'Brien, who died in 1998, and the daughter of actress Marguerite Churchill.

References

External links
 Time Magazine article, December 9, 1966
 New York Philharmonic profile
 Juilliard School profile
 Mannes College The New School for Music profile
 Manhattan School of Music profile

1935 births
Living people
Classical double-bassists
University of California, Los Angeles alumni
Juilliard School alumni
Juilliard School faculty
Manhattan School of Music faculty
21st-century double-bassists
Music Academy of the West alumni